The People's Choice is an American television sitcom that aired on NBC from 1955 to 1958. It was primarily sponsored by the Borden Company. Production of the series was overseen by George Burns's company, McCadden Productions.

It stars Jackie Cooper as Socrates "Sock" Miller, who is a former Marine Korean War veteran and a young politician living in fictitious New City, California. Sock has a basset hound named "Cleo", whose thoughts (voiced by Mary Jane Croft), baleful observations of Sock's dilemmas, are recorded on the soundtrack for the viewers' amusement. The real name of the dog that played Cleo was "Bernadette". Much of Cleo's dialog consists of wisecracks.  The popularity of the basset hound breed increased markedly with the run of the show.

Overview
In the first season, Sock is an ornithologist and a city council member, who is living in a trailer park with his maiden Aunt "Gus" Bennett, short for Augusta (Margaret Irving) who had raised Sock after his parents' death when Sock was three years of age. Sock is dating Amanda "Mandy" Peoples (Patricia Breslin), the daughter of the mayor (Paul Maxey), who does not entirely approve of the relationship, but he gradually warms to Sock.

Later, Sock takes courses (though he is not in law school) to pass the California bar exam  to become an attorney, so he can then afford to marry Mandy. In the first-season finale, Sock suddenly proposes to Mandy and wants to elope.  He is afraid the mayor will want to stage a big wedding, and they will not be able to get married for many months. The couple drives to Nevada for a quickie wedding, intending to return in time for Sock to take his bar exam. On the way back, they are arrested for a traffic violation and must spend the night in jail.  This causes Sock to miss the bar exam. Sock wants to be independent of his father-in-law, so the couple agrees to keep their marriage a secret from the mayor until Sock gets his law license.

Most episodes in the second season are about Sock and Mandy trying to be together (as much as this could be depicted in the 1950s), while keeping the mayor from finding out that they are married.  At some point during the season, Aunt Gus and the mayor get married, and she learns that Sock and Mandy are married and agrees to keep their secret from the mayor.  By the end of the season, Sock has passed the bar, and their marriage is out in the open.  Sock's scheming Marine buddy, Rollo "the Hex" Hexley (Dick Wesson), moved in with Sock during the second season and appeared in 27 episodes and the original 1955 pilot.

In the third season, Sock manages a residential real-estate development called Barkerville Estates.  They still return to New City often enough for Mayor Peoples and Aunt Gus to appear regularly.

Guest stars

Nick Adams
Jack Albertson
Lola Albright
Eleanor Audley
Jacqueline Beer
James Best
Mel Blanc
Shirley Bonne
Joe E. Brown
George Chandler
Harry Cheshire
Andy Clyde
Joe Conley
Mike Connors
Jackie Coogan
Ellen Corby
Richard Deacon
Angie Dickinson
King Donovan
John Doucette

Ross Elliott
Yvonne Lime Fedderson
Frank Ferguson
James Flavin
Ned Glass
Charles Lane
Joi Lansing
Nan Leslie
Forrest Lewis
Howard McNear
Jay Novello
Louis Quinn
Addison Richards
Hal J. Smith
Doris Singleton
Olive Sturgess
Ann Tyrrell
Herb Vigran
Gregory Walcott as Stone Kenyon
Frank Wilcox

Production notes
The series was created and co-produced by Irving Brecher, who was also the creator of the 1949 sitcom, The Life of Riley. Although The People's Choice never made the top 30 programs, its ratings were respectable enough to warrant a place on NBC for three seasons. The show later became quite popular in syndication enjoying continuous daytime repeat broadcasts for more than a decade in several local markets following its original network run.

During its first year, The People's Choice aired opposite Stop the Music as that long-running  ABC series was concluding its final season.

Spin-off
From The People's Choice, Cleo the talking dog spawned the idea of a talking baby in the 1960–1961 NBC sitcom, Happy starring Ronnie Burns and Yvonne Lime Fedderson, who had also guest starred on The People's Choice.

In Spanish the show was known as "Cleo y yo".

References

External links
 

1955 American television series debuts
1958 American television series endings
1950s American sitcoms
Black-and-white American television shows
English-language television shows
NBC original programming
1950s American political comedy television series
Television shows set in California